This is a list of diplomatic missions in the Gambia. At present, the capital city of Banjul hosts 12 embassies. Several other countries have honorary consuls to provide emergency services to their citizens, while others accredit ambassadors from neighbouring countries.

Embassies

Other missions in Banjul
 (Embassy office)

Non-resident embassies
Most of the embassies accredited to the Gambia are located in Dakar, Senegal unless indicated otherwise.

 (Abuja)
 (Accra)

 (Rabat)

 (London)
 (Brussels)
 (Bamako)
 (Abuja)

 (Accra)

 (Accra)
 (Abuja)
 (Rabat)

 (New York)
 (Abuja)

 (Abuja)

 (Abuja)
 (Algiers)

Former Embassies
 (Taiwan)

See also
Foreign relations of the Gambia
List of diplomatic missions of the Gambia
 List of ambassadors of Israel to the Gambia

References
Listing of embassies and honorary consulates

Foreign relations of the Gambia
Gambia
Diplomatic missions